Matt Leitner (born November 27, 1990) is an American former professional ice hockey player who played in the American Hockey League (AHL).

Playing career
Leitner was named an ACHA All-American (West First Team) as a senior at Minnesota State after leading the Mavericks in scoring with nine goals and 32 assists for 41 points in 2014–15. In his junior year, Leitner's outstanding play was rewarded with a selection to the 2013–14 All-WCHA First Team.

Following his third full professional season in 2018–19, Leitner ended his playing career in accepting an assistant coaching role at the collegiate level with California State University, Long Beach.

Awards and honors

References

External links 

1990 births
Living people
People from Los Alamitos, California
Ice hockey players from California
Fargo Force players
Manchester Monarchs (ECHL) players
Milwaukee Admirals players
Minnesota State Mavericks men's ice hockey players
Ohio Junior Blue Jackets players
Ontario Reign (AHL) players
Springfield Thunderbirds players
Utica Comets players
American men's ice hockey centers
AHCA Division I men's ice hockey All-Americans

Minnesota State University, Mankato alumni